Rytidosperma unarede is a species of grass in the family Poaceae. The specific epithet is the Māori name unarede recorded by Raoul when the plant was first described in 1844.

Description
It is an slender perennial tufted grass, growing to about 45 cm in height. The leaf blade grows up to 40 in length and 3.5 mm wide, or is tightly inrolled. The panicle is erect, slightly branched, 5–10 cm long and 1–2.3 cm wide.

Distribution and habitat
The grass is native to New Zealand. It is also a rare inhabitant of Australia’s subtropical Lord Howe Island in the Tasman Sea. On Lord Howe it is recorded as growing in goat dung-affected soil on dry basalt.

References

unarede
Grasses of Oceania
Flora of New Zealand
Flora of Lord Howe Island
Plants described in 1844
Taxa named by Étienne Raoul